Pallavada is a village in the Tiruvallur district of Tamil Nadu, India. It is located in the Gummidipoondi taluk. Famous for festivals and celebrations.

Economy 

The economy of the village is driven by agricultural activities. Water melon, peanuts and rice are the most cultivated crops. As of 2016, nearly 40% of the villagers (age 6+) are illiterate, but some people have completed graduation.

Culture

The village is home to the Dharamaraja Swami temple. The 11-day annual festival of the temple attracts around 25,000 people. The village celebrates Vinayaka Chaturthi festival with music and kuttu dance. Another major festival is Pongal. Girls sing folk songs called bathukamma.

The young villagers started Pallavada anbu ullagal association in 2013, which organizes a number of events in the village and nearby areas.

Popular festivals in the village include:

 11-day festival for lord Dharma-raja-swami temple.
 2-day festival  for lord Venkateswara temple which happens every year in the month of June.
 Vinayaka Chaturthi with kuttu dance and some other activities.
 Pongal: Girls together and enjoyed in the name of 'gobbi'. Men together and enjoyed in the name of 'kolatam'.
 Karthika deepam is celebrated in lord Siva temple.

Transport 

The village is connected to nearby towns by buses. The Tamil Nadu government runs two bus services (113 cross and 35) reaching this village. The Andhra Pradesh Government also runs two buses connecting the village to Uthukottai and Sullurupattai. Private buses are also flying in this route connected to chennai and tiruvallur. Shared auto rickshaws via Madaharpakkam to Arambakkam are also available.

Demographics 

The main languages spoken in the village are Tamil and Telugu.

According to the 2011 census of India, Pallavada has 512 households. The effective literacy rate (i.e. the literacy rate of population excluding children aged 6 and below) is 63.24%.

References 

Villages in Gummidipoondi taluk